Power Shift or Powershift may refer to:

Powershift (book), a 1990 futurology book by Alvin Toffler
Power Shift (conference), an annual youth summit on climate change
Power Shift Network, an American nonprofit organization
Powershifting, a driving technique
Ford PowerShift transmission
John Deere Powershift transmission